Andre De Grasse (born November 10, 1994) is a Canadian sprinter. A six-time Olympic medalist, De Grasse is the 2020 Olympic champion in the 200 m, and also won the silver in the 200 m in 2016. He won a second silver in the 4×100 relay in 2020. He also has three Olympic bronze medals, placing third in the 100 m at both the 2016 and 2020 Games, and also in the 4×100 m relay in 2016.

At the World Athletics Championships, De Grasse won a gold medal with the Canadian 4×100 relay team in 2022, as well as a bronze medal in the same event in 2015. He has three individual World medals, winning silver in the 200 m in 2019 in Doha, and two bronzes in the 100 m in 2015 and 2019. He was also the double Pan American champion and the NCAA champion in the 100 m and 200 m. He is the current Canadian record holder in the 200 m, running a 19.62 in Tokyo and making him the eighth fastest man in history in the 200 m.

De Grasse is the first Canadian sprinter to win three medals in a single Olympics, bettering the two medals in a single Olympics that were won by Canadian sprinters Donovan Bailey and Percy Williams. His gold medal finish at the 2020 Olympics was the first Canadian Olympic gold in track in 25 years and the first in the 200 m in 93 years. A consistent podium finisher, he has won a medal in every Olympic and World Championship in the finals he has competed in.

Early life
Andre De Grasse was born in the Toronto suburb of Scarborough, Ontario. His mother, Beverley De Grasse, was a high school sprinter in Trinidad and Tobago before she moved to Canada at age 26. His father, Alexander Waithe, moved from Barbados to Canada as a teenager. 
De Grasse was raised in Markham, Ontario and attended St. Marguerite Bourgeoys Catholic Elementary School from kindergarten to grade two. He later transferred to Mother Teresa Catholic School in Markham, Ont. to continue until grade eight, where he won his first race in 2006. He also attended Father Michael McGivney Catholic Academy and Milliken Mills High School.

In high school, De Grasse initially played basketball, at one point playing against future NBA player Andrew Wiggins of Vaughan Secondary School. In his first high school track race, the York Region Championships, De Grasse ran wearing basketball shorts and borrowed spikes; he also ignored the starting blocks and did a standing start. Despite his clear inexperience, he finished second in the 100m final with 10.91, third overall in the 200m with 22.64, and 7th overall in the Long Jump with 5.88m. He was spotted by future coach Tony Sharpe who noticed his impressive results compensating for the lack of starting blocks and proper racing attire. Sharpe invited De Grasse to join Pickering's Speed Academy. All three events were won by his eventual Olympic teammate Bolade Ajomale of Alexander Mackenzie High School. Having finished in the top 4 in the 100m and 200m, De Grasse qualified for the Ontario Central Championships, where he finished 4th in the 100m and 10th overall in the 200m. Finally, having qualified for the Ontario Championships in the 100m, De Grasse placed 5th in the final. He then began to train under Sharpe at The Speed Academy.

At the 2013 Canada Games, De Grasse won three gold medals in the 100, 200, and 4×100-metre relay.

Collegiate career
He attended Coffeyville Community College in 2013 and 2014 before transferring to USC for his junior season in 2015.

Competing for USC, De Grasse's legal 100 m time of 9.97 won the Pac-12 championship in May 2015 was the first time he ran under 10 seconds, and he became the first Canadian to do so since Bruny Surin. In the 200m, De Grasse broke the Canadian record with 20.03, and closed on it again with 20.05 in the final. De Grasse nabbed global attention at the NCAA Championships by winning both the 100 and 200 metres ahead of favourite Trayvon Bromell of Baylor University with wind-aided times of 9.75 and 19.58, respectively. After the race, with encouragement from his friends to keep going in the pursuit of titles, he said "So I ask myself...world champion? Olympic champion? Why not me? I've come this far, and I've only scratched the surface. I want to keep it going. Track is fun to me, and as long as it stays this way, I expect to keep getting better."

Athletics career

2015 season

2015 Pan American Games
After winning the national 100m title with a personal best of 9.95, De Grasse's next major event was the 2015 Pan American Games held in his home province of Ontario. He won the gold medal in the 100m with a time of 10.05. After the race, De Grasse said of the home crowd that "Aw, it was great. I think they gave me an extra boost of energy; the crowd was amazing; I hear them cheering my name and screaming my name." De Grasse doubled and won gold in the 200m with a new national record of 19.88. De Grasse became the first Canadian in history to run both a sub-10 in the 100 metres and sub-20 in the 200. He appeared to win a third Pan Am Games gold when he ran the second leg of the 4 x 100m relay, in which the Canadian team came first in the race with a Games record of 38.06. However, the team was later disqualified two hours after the race for a lane infringement by Gavin Smellie.

2015 World Championships
The 2015 World Championships in Athletics took place in Beijing. At the event, De Grasse cruised through his heat in 9.99, then made headlines when he nearly beat Usain Bolt, who stumbled out of the blocks. The two clocked 9.96, with Bolt just thousandths ahead. In the final, De Grasse tied for the bronze medal with Bromell, running a new personal best of 9.92. He became the first Canadian to win a medal in track's marquee event since Bruny Surin raced to silver in 1999. After the final De Grasse said "I didn't know who had won the race, I didn't know you could actually tie with someone for a bronze medal. So I am very happy for Trayvon and proud of myself to come away with a personal best. To race against these guys and make the final, I couldn't end the season any better than that. I can't let [the lane assignment] distract me. At the end of the day, it's the 100m final. This was the biggest race of my life, so I wasn't going to think about no lane assignment. I had a lot of confidence after the semi-finals, being that close to Bolt, and that raised my confidence for the final." De Grasse also participated in the 4 × 100m relay, where he won a second bronze medal, running a 38.13 together with Aaron Brown, Brendon Rodney, and Justyn Warner.

De Grasse turned professional in December 2015, signing with Puma for $11.25 million.

2016 season
De Grasse got a rocky start in the 2016 season, finishing 8th at the Prefontaine Classic. However, he shook off the race rust in June and won the 200m in Birmingham and the 100m in Oslo. He defended his national 100m title in 9.99, his first sub-10 of the season, and qualified for Canada's Olympic team. He also qualified for the 200m, albeit finishing 3rd at the championships behind Rodney and Brown.

2016 Summer Olympics
 
De Grasse entered the Rio Olympics carrying Canada's hopes as a medallist. He advanced to the finals of the 100m with ease after running a time of 10.04 in his heat and then equaling his personal best of 9.92 in the semi-finals. He impressed many by staying level with Usain Bolt during their semifinal and even appeared to mimic the world record holder, the two Puma sponsorees crossing the line together with smiles. De Grasse won the bronze medal in the final in 9.91 seconds, a new personal best, behind Bolt and his main rival Justin Gatlin. He became the first male athlete to win a medal for Canada at the 2016 Summer Olympics. De Grasse's medal sparked talk of him being Bolt's heir apparent in the athletics world, a claim that Bolt supported:

After that, De Grasse said of his relationship with Bolt, "We were just having some fun. Me (sic) and Usain met back in January, we did a lot of things together. He feels like I'm the next one, and now I'm just trying to live up to it." Former Canadian Olympic Champion Donovan Bailey was seen jumping up and down in the CBC Sports studio, cheering on De Grasse. After, he said, "I'm shaking. This is great for track and field in Canada."

In the 200 m, De Grasse had the fastest time in the heats of 20.09. De Grasse and Bolt were again lined up beside each other in the semi-finals. Bolt led at halfway when De Grasse suddenly rushed to his shoulder, appearing to try to beat him. The two exchanged smiles and crossed the line together, one of the most iconic moments of the games. De Grasse claimed his strategy was to tire Bolt out before the final, which Bolt did not appear to appreciate. De Grasse's time of 19.80 was a new Canadian record, and he became the first Canadian to make it to the finals of the 200m since Atlee Mahorn at the 1988 Olympics in Seoul. Despite his tactic, De Grasse finished behind Bolt again, this time with the silver medal in 20.02, the first Canadian to win a medal in the 200m since Percy Williams at the 1928 Olympics in Amsterdam.

De Grasse ran the anchor for the finals of the 4 x 100 m relay. Initially in 6th place, De Grasse made an incredible close on Japan and the United States by about 4 metres, though he narrowly missed the bronze medal by 0.02 seconds. Despite this, the Canadians set a new national record of 37.64 seconds, breaking the record set in 1996 in Atlanta. However, the American team that placed third was disqualified for a zone violation (handing over the baton outside of the designated zone) at the first baton change, so the Canadians were awarded the bronze medal.

2017 season
As in 2016, De Grasse had a rocky start to his season but quickly picked up again. He took Diamond League wins over the 100m in Oslo and Stockholm, and 200m wins in Rome and Rabat. His time in Stockholm of 9.69w (+4.8 m/s) was over the 2.0 m/s wind limit but the 4th fastest in history regardless. With Bolt choosing to forego the 200m, De Grasse was considered a strong favourite for the world title in London. His main goal was to beat Bolt in the 100m before his retirement after the championships. After winning both the 100m and 200m national titles, De Grasse was in contention to make the same double in London and defeat the world record holder. However, just days before the world championships, De Grasse strained his hamstring and was forced to pull out of both events, effectively ending his goal of beating Bolt before his retirement. A few weeks earlier, the two were set to face off in Monaco, but De Grasse was reportedly pulled out the race. His coach claimed it was Bolt's doing, likely involving contract clauses with Bolt's team, who were unwilling to see De Grasse potentially defeat him before the championships. A few days later, Bolt also said in an interview that "The last guy I said was going to be great disrespected me", a comment interpreted to be about De Grasse and his unexpected move in the semifinals of the 200 in Rio. Despite the apparent tensions, Bolt admitted he would have liked to race De Grasse in London.

2018 season
On January 10, 2018, De Grasse was named to Canada's 2018 Commonwealth Games team. However, he had withdrawn before the games began due to his hamstring injury.

In the Diamond League, De Grasse finished 6th in the 200m in Doha and 8th in the 100m in Shanghai, clearly affected by his injuries. He was unable to defend his national title in the 100m, settling for third in 10.20. During the 200m heats, he pulled up with a hamstring injury; the crowd cheered De Grasse on as he walked to the finish line, and he ended his season. Following his injuries, De Grasse left ALTIS and coach Stu McMillan in Arizona, moving to Jacksonville to train under Rana Reider.

2019 season

Return from injury

Despite initial struggles in the early season, De Grasse appeared to be making a slow return to international competition. He finished second to Aaron Brown in the 200m at the Diamond League in Shanghai. A month later, he won his first Diamond League victory in two years at the Rabat 200m event, beating the reigning World champion Ramil Guliyev.  Ultimately, he would finish on the podium in five of seven 100m events and all six 200m in the leadup to the World Championships. The following week, he beat Christian Coleman at the Ostrava Golden Spike in the 200m with 19.91. In July, he broke 10 seconds for the first time in 3 years at the Diamond League in London.

2019 World Championships 
At the national championships, De Grasse nearly beat Brown in the 100m, the two clocking 10.03 and being separated by thousandths. He was named to the Canadian team for the 2019 World Athletics Championships in Doha in both of his disciplines. Across the season, De Grasse remained consistent at multiple Diamond League races, clocking several sub-20 second races across the 200m. He ended his pre-championship season with a 100m win at the ISTAF Berlin in 9.97.

At the championships, De Grasse made his contention official by winning his semifinal in the 100m, beating defending champion Justin Gatlin and number 2 all-time Yohan Blake. He won bronze in the final with 9.90, a new personal best once again. Competing next in the 200m, he won the silver medal behind Noah Lyles in 19.95, shy of his season's best of 19.87. De Grasse commented that he tired slightly toward the end of the race but that "I'm not disappointed. I didn't think I'd be here a year ago." This was the first World Championship medal for a Canadian in the 200m since Atlee Mahorn in 1991. He anchored the Canadian 4 × 100 team once again but came short of qualifying for the final despite setting a season's best of 37.91 and finishing eighth overall.

2021 season
The onset of the COVID-19 pandemic resulted in the cancellation of much of the 2020 international season and the delay of the 2020 Summer Olympics by a year. De Grasse opened his 2021 season on April 17 at the Tom Jones Memorial Invitational in Gainesville, Florida, running the 100m in 9.99. His subsequent 100 m starts, including two appearances on the 2021 Diamond League circuit, saw times of over ten seconds. He enjoyed more success in the 200m, finishing in the top three in all of his three Diamond League appearances, including winning the Oslo event with a time of 20.09. He also participated in the Müller British Grand Prix as part of the Canadian 4 x 100m relay team, which placed second with a time of 38.29.

2020 Summer Olympics
De Grasse was named to the 2020 Canadian Olympic team and was identified as one of Canada's top medal contenders in athletics, notwithstanding some of his early results that year. Former Olympic champion Donovan Bailey dismissed concerns regarding De Grasse's times, stating that, in his view, he was "more concerned that he's injury-free and been consistent."

Upon arrival in Tokyo for the 2020 Summer Olympics, De Grasse began by competing in the heats of the men's 100m. He easily won his heat, posting a new season-best time of 9.91, just 0.01 shy of his personal best from two years before, and ended up with the fastest time in any of the heats. He was second in his semi-final behind Fred Kerley, running 9.98, and advanced to the final. In the final, De Grasse had the unfavourable ninth lane placement and was slow off the blocks, but rapidly gained ground over the final forty metres of the race to finish in third place and claim his second bronze medal in the event, with a new personal best time of 9.89. This was Canada's fourteenth medal of the Tokyo Olympics and the first for a male athlete. The lack of medals for Canadian men had become a point of media and viewer discussion through the first nine days of the Games. He also became the first Canadian man to win multiple Olympic medals in the 100 m.

De Grasse next competed in the heats of the 200 m, qualifying automatically as the third man in his heat with 20.56. This had him again in the unfavourable ninth lane when in his semi-final, he set a new personal best and national record of 19.73, the fastest time in the semi-final phase. De Grasse then went on to win the gold medal in the 200m final in a personal best and Canadian record time of 19.62 seconds, making him the 8th fastest of all-time over 200 metres. This was Canada's first track gold medal since 1996, and the first gold medal in the 200m since Percy Williams' victory in 1928. De Grasse was the only male sprinter to compete in both the 100 and 200 m races in Tokyo.

Hours after his gold medal win, De Grasse competed in the heats of the 4x100 m relay alongside Aaron Brown, Jerome Blake and Brendon Rodney. Again taking the anchor leg, at the point, De Grasse took the baton from Rodney, the Canadian team was judged to be in approximately fifth place, but De Grasse reached the finish line in second, only two-thousandths of a second behind Chinese anchor runner Wu Zhiqiang. The Canadian team's qualifying time was third-fastest in the heats, behind Jamaica and China. De Grasse repeated this performance in the event final, taking Canada from fifth to the bronze medal position on the anchor leg, securing his sixth Olympic medal. This bronze was later upgraded to a silver when the team from Great Britain was disqualified. This tied him with Cindy Klassen and Clara Hughes as the second-most decorated Canadian Olympian (behind Penny Oleksiak).

2021 Diamond League
In his first event subsequent to the Olympics, De Grasse returned to the Diamond League for the Prefontaine Classic in Eugene, Oregon. Running in the 100 metres event, De Grasse recorded a wind-assisted time of 9.74 seconds, winning the event ahead of Tokyo silver medalist Kerley. De Grasse said that following the Olympics, he "just went out there to have some fun." Weeks later in the Diamond League Final in Zurich, De Grasse placed second in both the 100 and 200 metres events, running in both on the same night. He equalled his 9.89 time from the Olympics and then ran 19.72 an hour later, despite later saying, "I just had no gas" for the latter. He called it the end of "my greatest season ever."

2022 season
The 2022 season began with difficulties for De Grasse, who was hampered by an injury to his foot. After a ninth-place finish at the Prefontaine Classic in the 100 m, he won gold at the Bislett Games in Oslo with a season-best time of 10.05 seconds. Shortly afterward, he contracted COVID-19 for the second time, experiencing a significant setback to his training due to breathing difficulties. 

Despite his health struggles, he opted to compete at the 2022 World Athletics Championships in Eugene, Oregon. In the 100 m, De Grasse was second in his heat with a 10.12 time, qualifying to the semi-finals, despite visible difficulties. He ran a 10.21 in the semi-finals and did not advance to the final; the first time at an individual World event, he had failed to win a medal. In light of his health, De Grasse said, "it's alright. It's been a challenging season. I'll take it; I made it to the semifinals." He subsequently chose to withdraw from the 200 m. There were questions raised about his readiness in advance of the 4×100 m relay, but De Grasse indicated that he felt able to compete. The Canadian team qualified for the finals with the third-fastest time in the heats, De Grasse being pipped at the line by Frenchman Jimmy Vicaut by 0.01 seconds. In the final, the Canadians staged a major upset victory over the heavily favoured American team to take the gold medal, aided by smooth baton exchanges while the Americans made multiple fumbles. De Grasse ran the anchor leg for Canada, maintaining the lead over American Marvin Bracy to secure his first-ever relay major championship gold, breaking the national record he had previously helped set at the Rio Olympics. This was Canada's third gold in the event, and the others being consecutive Bailey era wins in 1995 and 1997. The result "stunned" the heavily American crowd at Hayward Field, but De Grasse noted "there's a lot of Canadian flags out there, a lot of fans cheering us on -- it definitely feels good. It's not technically on home soil, but it kind of felt like it." Reflecting on the historic win with his teammates, he said: "We have talked and dreamed about this moment together."

De Grasse was initially named to the Canadian team for the 2022 Commonwealth Games, but withdrew after the World Championships, with Athletics Canada citing a need "to properly recover and prepare for the rest of the season."

Philanthropy and public appearances
In 2016, he established the Andre De Grasse Holiday Classic Basketball Tournament, a charity event that supports the Andre De Grasse Family Foundation. In September 2017, he appeared at WE Day, a WE Charity event in Toronto. De Grasse also created and participates annually in a basketball tournament named "Holiday Classic at Markham" at Pan Am Centre. All proceeds from the tournament go to the Andre De Grasse Family Foundation.

Personal life
He and his wife, American hurdler Nia Ali, have a daughter, Yuri, born June 2018 and a second child in May 2021. De Grasse is Catholic, having been influenced by the faith of his parents. He has the word "hope" and a prayer tattooed on his arm.

Honours
De Grasse's success at the Olympics led to him winning the 2016 Lionel Conacher Award as the Canadian Press male athlete of the year, and be presented with the Rising Star Award by the IAAF. In April 2017 De Grasse was a recipient of a Harry Jerome Award.

Statistics
Information from World Athletics profile unless otherwise noted.

Personal bests

Seasonal bests

International championship results

National championship results

NJCAA and NCAA results from Track & Field Results Reporting System.

Circuit wins
Diamond League (Events in parenthesis) 
Birmingham: 2016 (200 m)
Eugene: 2021 (100 m)
Oslo: 2016 (100 m), 2017 (100 m), 2021 (200 m), 2022 (100 m)
Rome: 2017 (200 m)
Stockholm: 2017 (100 m)
Rabat: 2017 (200 m), 2019 (200 m)

Notes

References

External links

 
 
  (USC)
  (Coffeyville)
 
 
 
 
 
 

1994 births
Living people
Athletes from Toronto
Athletes (track and field) at the 2014 Commonwealth Games
Athletes (track and field) at the 2015 Pan American Games
Athletes (track and field) at the 2016 Summer Olympics
Athletes (track and field) at the 2020 Summer Olympics
Black Canadian track and field athletes
Canadian male sprinters
Canadian people of Barbadian descent
Canadian Roman Catholics
Canadian sportspeople of Trinidad and Tobago descent
Coffeyville Community College alumni
Commonwealth Games competitors for Canada
Medalists at the 2015 Pan American Games
Medalists at the 2016 Summer Olympics
Medalists at the 2020 Summer Olympics
Olympic track and field athletes of Canada
Olympic bronze medalists for Canada
Olympic bronze medalists in athletics (track and field)
Olympic silver medalists for Canada
Olympic silver medalists in athletics (track and field)
Olympic gold medalists for Canada
Olympic gold medalists in athletics (track and field)
Olympic male sprinters
Pan American Games gold medalists for Canada
Pan American Games medalists in athletics (track and field)
Pan American Games track and field athletes for Canada
Sportspeople from Markham, Ontario
Sportspeople from Scarborough, Toronto
USC Trojans men's track and field athletes
World Athletics Championships athletes for Canada
World Athletics Championships medalists